Elizabeth Jane Weir  (born February 20, 1948) is a Canadian lawyer and politician in New Brunswick. She was elected leader of the New Democratic Party of New Brunswick in June 1988 and became an opposition voice to the Liberal government, which held all 58 seats in the Legislative Assembly of New Brunswick.

Born in Belfast, Northern Ireland, Weir was educated at the University of Waterloo and the University of Western Ontario. She has taught at York University and the University of New Brunswick. Weir was first elected to the legislature in 1991 in the riding of Saint John South where she defeated Liberal John Mooney by only 78 votes. In 1995, the riding became Saint John Harbour and she was re-elected in 1995, 1999 and 2003. During that time, she was the sole New Democrat in the legislature.

At the 2003 federal NDP convention at which Jack Layton would be elected party leader, Weir sought the presidency of the federal party against re-offering incumbent Adam Giambrone. Midway through the convention, Giambrone and Weir decided to seek a co-presidency. Many delegates balked, especially at the assumption that they could push through a sudden constitutional change in a party often dearly concerned with internal process. The joint ticket was withdrawn, and Weir placed second after Giambrone and ahead of a candidate from the NDP Socialist Caucus.

On October 8, 2004, Weir announced that she would be stepping down from the leadership of the New Brunswick NDP but would stay on until a successor was chosen. She also pledged to run for re-election to the legislature in the next general election; however, she eventually reversed this pledge. Allison Brewer was chosen as her successor at a September 2005 leadership convention and Weir resigned her seat from the legislature on October 13, 2005 to accept the appointment to be the first president and CEO of the new New Brunswick crown corporation the Energy Efficiency and Conservation Agency.

Weir was made a Member of the Order of New Brunswick in 2021.

See also
 List of University of Waterloo people

References

 
 Women MLAs, New Brunswick Legislative Library

Lawyers in New Brunswick
Women MLAs in New Brunswick
Living people
1948 births
Female Canadian political party leaders
New Brunswick New Democratic Party leaders
New Brunswick New Democratic Party MLAs
Politicians from Belfast
Academic staff of the University of New Brunswick
University of Waterloo alumni
University of Western Ontario alumni
Academic staff of York University
Canadian women lawyers
Members of the Order of New Brunswick
21st-century Canadian politicians
21st-century Canadian women politicians